Sheeri is a village located in Baramulla district of Jammu and Kashmir, India. The village has two adjoining areas namely "Sheeri Bala" and "Sheeri Payeen".

References 

Villages in Baramulla district